Beaver Brook is a  tributary of the Pequest River in western New Jersey in the United States.

Beaver Brook originates near Blairstown and terminates at its confluence with the Pequest River near Belvidere.

See also
List of rivers of New Jersey

References

External links
U.S. Geological Survey: NJ stream gaging stations

Rivers of New Jersey
Tributaries of the Delaware River
Rivers of Warren County, New Jersey